Apolinar Solórzano Bustamante (born 23 July 1934) is a Venezuelan sprinter. He competed in the men's 200 metres at the 1956 Summer Olympics.

References

1934 births
Living people
Athletes (track and field) at the 1956 Summer Olympics
Venezuelan male sprinters
Olympic athletes of Venezuela
Place of birth missing (living people)
Pan American Games medalists in athletics (track and field)
Pan American Games silver medalists for Venezuela
Pan American Games bronze medalists for Venezuela
Athletes (track and field) at the 1955 Pan American Games
Medalists at the 1955 Pan American Games